East Columbia is a neighborhood in North and Northeast Portland, Oregon, consisting of a main area west and north of the Sunderland neighborhood, and a smaller exclave on the Columbia River south of Hayden Island and east of Bridgeton.

The neighborhood includes the Columbia Children's Arboretum (1999) and the Columbia Edgewater Golf Club.

References

External links
 
 Official Website
 Guide to East Columbia Neighborhood (PortlandNeighborhood.com)
East Columbia Street Tree Inventory Report

 
Neighborhoods in Portland, Oregon
Oregon populated places on the Columbia River
Northeast Portland, Oregon
North Portland, Oregon